The National Garden or Ministry of Foreign Affairs Gate is a historical and governmental compound in Tehran, Iran.

Formerly referred to as the Parade Square, it used to be a military shooting range during the Qajar period. It was then turned into a public park for a short period, and eventually important governmental offices and museums were built around it.

Building number 9 of the Ministry of Foreign Affairs (formerly the "Police House"), the University of Art (formerly the "Cossack House"), Malek National Museum, Post and Communication Museum, and the National Museum are situated in the compound.

History
The field was first constructed as a shooting practice range, during the reign of the Qajar dynasty. It was used for the military garrison, and the Cossacks practiced military parade in it. The range was then developed during the reign of Nasser ed Din Shah, with a new building named Cossack House, which was somewhat transformed during the reign of Mozaffar ed Din Shah.

Under the rule of Reza Shah of the Pahlavi Dynasty, the range was turned into a modern public park for a short period, and the famous gate of the compound was built by Mirza Mehdi Khan Shaghaghi (Momtahen od Dowle) before the arrival of World War II. Eventually, important governmental buildings were built around the compound; such as the "Police House" (or the "Shahrbani House") which was built for Shahrbani, an organization responsible for maintaining security in the city.

Gallery

References

See also
National Museum of Iran
Sa'dabad Complex
Museum of the Qasr Prison
Ferdows Garden

Buildings and structures in Tehran
Architecture in Iran
Qajar Iran